Arlene Sanford is an American film and television director.

Sanford has directed for several notable television series and several motion picture and television films which include A Very Brady Sequel (1996), I'll Be Home for Christmas (1998) and Twelve Men of Christmas (2009).

Sanford has been nominated for two Primetime Emmy Awards for Outstanding Directing for a Drama Series for her work on the David E. Kelley-produced series Ally McBeal (in 1999) and Boston Legal (in 2008).

Filmography
Almost Family (2019) TV series
episode #9: "Rehabilitated AF"
Grand Hotel (2019) TV series
episode #6: "Love Thy Neighbor"
Pretty Little Liars: The Perfectionists (2019) TV series
Life Sentence (2018) TV series
episode #5: "Wes Side Story"
Good Luck Charlie, It's Christmas! (2011) TV film
Pretty Little Liars (2010–2016) TV series
Twelve Men of Christmas (2009) TV film
My Boys (2006) TV Series
Psych (2006) TV series
Weeds (2005) TV series
episode #6: "Dead in the Nethers"
The Bad Girl's Guide (2005) TV series
Boston Legal (2004) TV series
episode 1.09 "A Greater Good
episode 2.02 "Schadenfreude"
Desperate Housewives (2004) TV series
episode 1.03 "Pretty Little Picture"
episode 1.05 "Come In, Stranger"
episode 1.13 "Your Fault"
episode 1.16 "The Ladies Who Lunch"
episode 1.19 "Live Alone and Like It"
episode 2.03 "You'll Never Get Away from Me"
episode 2.10 "Coming Home"
Miss Match (2003) TV Series
Eve (2003) TV series
Everwood (2002) TV Series
episode 1.05 "Deer God"
episode 1.17 "Everwood, Confidential"
episode 1.19 "The Miracle of Everwood"
Frank McKlusky, C.I. (2002)
Go Fish (2001) TV series
episode "Go Wrestle"
Boston Public (2000) TV series
Ed (2000) TV Series
Gilmore Girls (2000) TV series
episode 1.02 "The Lorelais' First Day at Chilton"
Battery Park (2000) TV series
Malcolm in the Middle (2000) TV series
episode 1.02 "Red Dress"
episode 1.11 "Funeral"
episode 2.12 "Krelboyne Girl"
Ally (1999) TV series
The West Wing (1999) TV series
episode 1.12 "He Shall, from Time to Time"
Once and Again (1999) TV series
I'll Be Home for Christmas (1998) Theatrical film
Dawson's Creek (1998) TV series
Ally McBeal (1997) TV series
episode 1.04 "The Affair"
episode 2.16 "Sex, Lies and Politics"
episode 2.18 "Those Lips, That Hand"
episode 3.06 "Changes"
episode 4.06 "Tis the Season"
episode 5.16 and 5.17 "Love Is All Around"
Temporarily Yours (1997) TV series
A Very Brady Sequel (1996) Theatrical film
The Last Frontier (1996) TV series
Too Something (1995) TV Series
Caroline in the City (1995) TV series
The Naked Truth (1995) TV series
Pride & Joy (1995) TV Series
Friends (1994) TV series
episode 1.06 "The One with the Butt"
All American Girl (1994) TV series
The Babymaker: The Dr. Cecil Jacobson Story (1994) TV film
Arly Hanks (1993) TV film
Sisters (1991) TV series
Ferris Bueller (1990) TV Series
Dream On (1990) TV series
Coach (1989) TV series
The Wonder Years (1988) TV series
episode "Dance with Me"
Eisenhower & Lutz (1988) TV series
Hooperman (1987) TV Series
The Days and Nights of Molly Dodd (1987) TV series
Designing Women (1986) TV series
Welcome Home (1986)
Rituals (1985) TV series

References

External links

American television directors
American women film directors
American women television directors
Living people
Place of birth missing (living people)
Year of birth missing (living people)
21st-century American women